Per Sandgaard (born 13 March 1967) is a Danish-Swedish equestrian. He competed in two events at the 2004 Summer Olympics.

References

1967 births
Living people
Danish male equestrians
Danish dressage riders
Swedish male equestrians
Swedish dressage riders
Olympic equestrians of Denmark
Equestrians at the 2004 Summer Olympics
Place of birth missing (living people)